Giovanni Marín (born February 18, 1987, in Mexico City) is a professional Mexican footballer who currently plays for Venados on loan from Cruz Azul.

External links
Ascenso MX 

Living people
1987 births
Footballers from Mexico City
Mexican footballers
Association footballers not categorized by position